Hamburg-Mitte (Hamburg Central) is one of the seven boroughs of Hamburg, Germany, covering most of the city's urban center. The quarters of Hamburg-Altstadt and Neustadt cover much of the city's historic core. In 2020 the population was 301,231.

History 

In 1937 several settlements (e.g. Finkenwerder), villages and rural areas were passed into Hamburg enforced by the Greater Hamburg Act.

On 1 March 2008 due to a law of Hamburg, the quarter Wilhelmsburg was transferred from the borough Harburg. The neighborhood HafenCity was formed from parts of the quarters Klostertor, Altstadt and Rothenburgsort. The other part of Klostertor was transferred to Hammerbrook. From small parts of the borough Hamburg-Mitte (And Altona and Eimsbüttel) the neighborhood Sternschanze was created as a quarter in the borough Altona.

Geography 

The borough severs Hamburg from the east to the west.

Subdivisions 
Hamburg-Mitte consists of the quarters Billbrook, Billstedt, Borgfelde, Finkenwerder, HafenCity, Hamburg-Altstadt, Hamburg-Hamm, Hammerbrook, Horn, Kleiner Grasbrook, Neustadt, Neuwerk, Rothenburgsort, St. Georg, St. Pauli, Steinwerder, Veddel, Waltershof and Wilhelmsburg.

The historic center of Hamburg lies within the districts Altstadt, Neustadt and HafenCity, also defined by being inside the Wallring. These three districts also constitute what is considered Hamburg's Innenstadt (inner city).

Green and open spaces 

Planten un Blomen (plants and flowers) is a park located in the quarter St. Pauli and Neustadt. Located in the quarter Billstedt is the lake Öjendorfer See.

Culture

Museums and cultural institutions

Economy 

Hamburg-Mitte is the economic center of Hamburg. Altstadt, Neustadt and HafenCity make up Hamburg's Innenstadt (inner city), the city's shopping and central business district, while Hammerbrook's City Süd is an important decentralized business district. The facilities of the Port of Hamburg are located mostly in Hamburg-Mitte in the quarters of Kleiner Grasbrook, Steinwerder, Veddel, Waltershof and Wilhelmsburg.

Politics 

The Bezirksamt Hamburg-Mitte is located at Klosterwall 8.

Diet of the borough 
Simultaneously with elections to the state parliament (Bürgerschaft), the Bezirksversammlung is elected as representatives of the citizens. It consists of 53 representatives.

Elections 

|-
! colspan="2" style="text-align:left;" | Parties
! %
! ±
! Seats
|-
| style="background-color:" |
| style="text-align:left;" | Alliance 90/The Greens
| 29.3
|  11.2
| style="text-align:center;" | 16*
|-
| style="background-color:" |
| style="text-align:left;" | Social Democratic Party
| 27.0
|  10.0
| style="text-align:center;" | 14*
|-
| style="background-color:" |
| style="text-align:left;" | The Left
| 15.6
|  1.5
| style="text-align:center;" | 8
|-
| style="background-color:" |
| style="text-align:left;" | Christian Democratic Union
| 12.1
|  6.4
| style="text-align:center;" | 6
|-
| style="background-color:" |
| style="text-align:left;" | Alternative for Germany
| 7.7
|  2.6
| style="text-align:center;" | 4
|-
| style="background-color:" |
| style="text-align:left;" | Free Democratic Party
| 4.8
|  2.5
| style="text-align:center;" | 3
|-
| style="background-color:" |
| style="text-align:left;" | Pirate Party
| 2.2
|  2.2
| style="text-align:center;" | 0
|-
! colspan="2" style="text-align:left;" | Total
! style="text-align:center;" colspan="2"|
! style="text-align:center;" | 51
|}

After the election, 6 members of the Green Party changed their affiliation to SPD. Meaning, the SPD has 20 and the Greens have 10 seats in the current parliament.

Demographics 

In 2006 233,144 people lived in the borough.

In 1999 there were 126,753 households, out of which 17.9% had children under the age of 18 living with them and 52.4% of all households were made up of single occupants. The average household size was 1.83.

Population by year

In 2006 there were 71,559 criminal offences in borough (307 crimes per 1000 people).

Infrastructure 
The main local office (Bezirksamt Hamburg-Mitte) is located on Klosterwall. It has 4 local offices or "Customer Centres." These are Customer Centre Hamburg-Mitte, Customer Centre Billstedt, Customer Centre St. Pauli, and Customer Centre Wilhelmsburg. The offices are responsible, among other things, for the application for a residence permit for purposes of study after entering the country.

Government 
The Federal Maritime and Hydrographic Agency of Germany (BSH) has its head office in St. Pauli in Hamburg-Mitte, and the head office of Federal Bureau for Maritime Casualty Investigation is in the BSH facility.

Education 
The borough has 31 elementary schools and 31 secondary schools.

Health systems 
There were 125 day-care centers for children and 536 physicians in private practice and 72 pharmacies.
The Asklepios Klinik St. Georg  located in the quarter St. Georg, is the main hospital in Hamburg-Mitte.

Sports

Transport 

The borough is serviced by the rapid transit system of the city train and the underground railway with several stations. The central station Hamburg Hauptbahnhof is also for long-distance passenger trains for the German railway company.

According to the Department of Motor Vehicles (Kraftfahrt-Bundesamt), in the Hamburg-Mitte borough 66,831 private cars were registered (290 cars/1000 people). There were 2,432 traffic accidents in total, including 1,905 traffic accidents resulting in injuries.

Notable residents 
 Morsal Obeidi (murder victim), Rothenburgsort

References

General sources 

 Statistical office Hamburg and Schleswig-Holstein Statistisches Amt für Hamburg und Schleswig-Holstein, official website 
Act of the areal organisation, 6 July 2006 Gesetz über die räumliche Gliederung der Freien und Hansestadt Hamburg (RäumGiG)

External links 

 Official website of Mitte 
 Official website of Hamburg

 
Mitte